Odontoptilum angulata, the chestnut angle or banded angle, is a butterfly belonging to the family Hesperiidae and is found in India and southeast Asia.

Description

References

Tagiadini
Butterflies of Asia
Butterflies of Singapore
Butterflies of Indochina